Listin Stephen is an Indian film producer and distributor who works in Malayalam, Tamil and Hindi film industries. He founded the film production company Magic Frames that has produced and distributed a lot of successful movies over a decade. His debut production was Traffic (2011), which heralded in a new age of film-making style and rejuvenated Malayalam cinema.

Career
His debut production was Traffic (2011), which heralded in a new age of film-making style into Malayalam cinema. His second production was Chaappa Kurish (2011). While it encountered controversies, the film turned out to be a moderate commercial and critical hit. In 2012, he produced Ustad Hotel which won three National Film Awards, including the one for the Best Popular Film. Following the success of his films, he remade all three films in Tamil in association with R. Sarathkumar.

Filmography

As Producer

As Distributor

Television

References

External links 
 

Living people
Tamil film producers
Malayalam film producers
People from Kottayam district
1986 births
Film producers from Kerala
Producers who won the Best Popular Film Providing Wholesome Entertainment National Film Award